The Los Angeles Pet Memorial Park, formerly called the Los Angeles Pet Cemetery, is a pet cemetery located in Calabasas, California, United States.

Notable burials
Pete the Pup
Jiggs (chimpanzee)
Room 8 (a cat)
Tawny the Lion
Russell The Bunny
Kabar - Rudolph Valentino's Dog

References

External links
Official site

Calabasas, California
Animal cemeteries
Animal monuments